Bassani is an Italian surname. Notable people with the surname include:

 Axel Bassani (born 1999), Italian motorcycle racer
 Bilgé Ögün Bassani, Chief Executive Officer of the Association François-Xavier Bagnoud (FXB International)
 Edvin Liverić-Bassani (born 1970), Croatian theatre, television, film actor, pancer, performer and cultural manager
 Francesco Maria Bazzani (c.1650 – c.1700), Italian baroque composer
 Franco Bassani (1929–2008), Italian physicist
 Gaia Bassani Antivari (born 1978), alpine skier
 Giorgio Bassani (1916–2000), Italian novelist
 Giovanni Battista Bassani (1650 ? – 1716), Italian composer, violinist, and organist
 Johanna Bassani (2002–2020), Austrian combined Nordic skier and ski jumper
 Luca Bassani (born c. 1956), founder of Wally Yachts
 Orazio Bassani, "Orazio della Viola" (before 1570 - 1615), Italian viola-da-gambist
 Rodrigo Bassani da Cruz (born 1997), Brazilian footballer

See also
 Gaia Bassani Antivari (born 1978), alpine skier
 Bassanio, a fictional character in Shakespeare’s The Merchant of Venice
 Bassano (disambiguation)

Italian-language surnames